The 2017 Boston College Eagles football team represented Boston College during the 2017 NCAA Division I FBS football season. The Eagles played their home games at Alumni Stadium in Chestnut Hill, Massachusetts, and competed in the Atlantic Division of the Atlantic Coast Conference (ACC). They were led by fifth-year head coach Steve Addazio. They finished the season 7–6 overall and 4–4 in ACC play to place in a three-way tie for third in the Atlantic Division. They were invited to the Pinstripe Bowl, where they lost to Iowa.

Schedule
Boston College announced its 2017 football schedule on January 24, 2017. The 2017 schedule consisted of 6 home, 5 away and 1 neutral site game in the regular season. The Eagles hosted ACC foes Florida State, NC State, Virginia Tech, and Wake Forest, and traveled to Clemson, Louisville, Syracuse, and Virginia.

The Eagles hosted two of the four non-conference opponents, Central Michigan from the Mid-American Conference (MAC), Notre Dame, an independent, and traveled to Northern Illinois who is also from the MAC. Boston College met UConn from the American Athletic Conference at Fenway Park in late November.

Game summaries

at Northern Illinois

Wake Forest

Notre Dame

at Clemson

Central Michigan

Virginia Tech

at Louisville

at Virginia

Florida State

NC State

vs UConn

at Syracuse

vs Iowa–Pinstripe Bowl

2018 NFL Draft

References

Boston College
Boston College Eagles football seasons
Boston College Eagles football
Boston College Eagles football